Tatyana Mamonova (born 10 December 1943), is a founder of the modern Russian women's movement, an internationally renowned democratic women's leader, author, poet, journalist, videographer, artist, editor and public lecturer.

Early life
Mamonova was born in the Soviet Union, and was raised in Leningrad after World War II.

Career
Mamonova was the first feminist dissident exiled from the Soviet Union in 1980 for re-igniting the Russian women's movement; initiating her organization, then called Woman and Russia, the first NGO promoting the human rights of women from the Soviet Union and connecting Russian speaking women's voices and needs with the international community; and editing and publishing the samizdat Woman and Russia Almanac, now called Woman and Earth Almanac, an art and literary journal containing the first collection of Soviet feminist writings, which has now been published in 11 languages and in over 22 countries. Prior to her exile from her native St. Petersburg, Russia, she was the first woman organizer and exhibitor in the non-conformist artist movement in Russia and a literary and television journalist with Aurora Publishers (working alongside Josef Brodsky) and Leningrad Television. 

In 1987 Mamonova, became an associate of the Women's Institute for Freedom of the Press (WIFP). WIFP is an American nonprofit publishing organization. The organization works to increase communication between women and connect the public with forms of women-based media.

She contributed the piece "It's time we began with ourselves" to the 1984 anthology Sisterhood Is Global: The International Women's Movement Anthology, edited by Robin Morgan.

During her Ms. Magazine tour, Mamonova was invited by the Ford Foundation in New York City for a meeting and round-table discussion by leading executives from the foundation shortly after her exile and she received the highest praises from the Ford Foundation's executives for her intelligence, leadership and courage. 

Since her exile, in addition to continuing to edit and publish her Almanac nka Woman and Earth Almanac and two additional Woman and Earth publications: Succes d’estime (since 2001) and Fotoalbum: Around the World (since 2004), and to lead and expand her organization, now also called Woman and Earth Global Eco-Network, she has authored four books in the United States, as well as hundreds of articles and travelogues for journals, magazines and newspapers, including The New York Times, lectured in hundreds of universities and for public organizations in the United States and throughout the world including participating in a national lecture tour with Ms. Magazine, and tours of Africa, Australia, Japan, the United States, India, South America, Dominican Republic, Scandinavia, France, Germany, the Netherlands, Italy and Greece with support from Amnesty International, Alliance Français, Parliaments and labour and non-governmental organizations. She exhibited in more than 20 countries and sold her award-winning art, many times donating proceeds to benefit the activities of her NGO and human rights campaigns throughout the world. She is also Executive Producer of a weekly educational television series in Manhattan.

She is a former post-doctoral fellow with Harvard University's Bunting Institute, a member of Pen International, the Russia representative to the Sisterhood Is Global Institute, and has been the subject of documentary films, books, and all forms of media coverage from every leading medium including CBS Evening News with Morton Dean, The International Herald Tribune, The New York Times and the BBC.

2009 marked the 30th Jubilee of her NGO and samizdat. Celebrations were launched in December 2008 at Corinthia Nevskij Palace Hotel, St. Petersburg where she was formally honored as Woman of the Year and on March 7, 2009, at the Contemporary Art Network Gallery in mid-town Manhattan, New York which also included an exhibition of her paintings. The tour campaign continued in other world venues throughout the year.

Awards and honors
Woman of the Year 1980 by Femme Magazine, Paris
Post Doctoral Fellow Officer, Bunting Institute, Harvard University 1984-1985
Diamond Homer Poetry Award 1998, Poetry Society of Hollywood California
100 Heroines Award 1998 by the Women's Committee of Seneca Falls, NY
Human Rights Award, African Peace Network, Ghana 1999
Inclusion in Womenkind Project, Canada 2000
Inclusion in the Prominent Refugees Directory UNHCR 2001
Community Media Award by MNN, NYC 2001
Living Legacy Award 2002 by the Women's International Centre of San Diego, California
Inclusion in Prize-winning Portrait of Prominent Refugees by Brazilian Artist at Kenya Exhibition 2005
Heart of Danko Award 2006 for her artistic and cultural prowess
Woman of the Year 2008 by the Vishnevskaya Association of St. Petersburg, Russia

Her human rights case, which remains unresolved, was selected to be heard among the 10 finalists at the 17th International Human Rights Competition in Caen, France in January 2006.

Books
Femmes et Russie Almanach, (in French) Volumes 1–3, edited by Tatiana Mamonova. Paris: Edition Des Femmes, 1980–1981.
Zhentschina i Rossia Almanach, (in Russian) Volume 3, edited by Mamonova. Paris: Edition Des Femmes, 1980.
Voix de Femmes en Russia Almanach, (in French) Volume 4, edited by Mamonova. Paris: Denoel-Gontier, 1982.
Woman and Russia Almanach, Volume 1, edited by Mamonova. London: Sheba Press, 1980.
Kvinnen og Russland Almanach, Volume 1, edited by Mamonova. Oslo: Pax Forlag, 1980.
Kvinnan Ryssland Almanac, Volumes 1 & 2, edited by Mamonova. Stockholm: Awe Gebers, 1980.
Kvindren og Rusland Almanach, Volumes 1 & 2, edited by Mamonova. Copenhagen: Informations Forlag, 1980.
Die Frau und Russland Almanach, Volumes 1 & 2, edited by Mamonova. Munich: Frauenoffensive, 1980.
Die Frau und Russland Almanach, (in German) Volume 3, edited by Mamonova. Basel, Switzerland: Mond, 1982.
Das Radieschen (children's book), by Mamonova. Vienna: Blagina Verlag, 1981.
Vrouwen in Sovjet-Rusland Anthology from Volumes 1–3, edited by Mamonova. Amsterdam: Anthos, 1981.
Woman and Russia Anthology from Volumes 1–3, (in Japanese), edited by Mamonova. Tokyo: Shin-Ichi Masagaki & Miiko Kataoka, 1982.
Feminism in Russia Almanach, (in Greek), edited by Mamonova. Athens: Images, 1982.
Woman and Russia Almanac (1979-1991), now called Woman and Earth Almanac (1991–present), edited by Mamonova, New York: Woman and Earth Press.
Women and Russia, Feminist Writings from the Soviet Union, edited by Mamonova, Boston: Beacon Press, 1984.
Russian Women's Studies: Essays on Sexism in Soviet Culture, by Mamonova New York: Pergamon Press and Teacher's College Press, 1989, 1990, 1991.
Women's Glasnost vs Naglost: Stopping Russian Backlash, by Mamonova, with Chandra Niles Folsom. Westport, CT: Greenwood Press 1993.
Succes d’estime, by Tatyana Mamonova. New York: Woman and Earth Press, 2001–present.
Fotoalbum: Around the World, by Mamonova. New York: Woman and Earth Press, 2004–present.

Exhibitions
USSR    Leningrad	Kustarny per.	                 Fall	1971
USSR	Leningrad	Gaza Cultural Center 	         Win.	1974
USSR	Moscow		Touring Show with O.Rabin, N.Tsherbakova Spr.	1975
USSR	Leningrad	Nevsky Cultural Center	         Fall	1975
USSR	Leningrad	Vadim Nechaev Show, Rec'd Prize in Rome*1 1975
USSR	Estonia		Kohtla-Jarve Cultural Center     Sum.	1977
USSR	Leningrad	Ul. Pravda d.22			        1978
FRANCE	Paris		Bd. Voltaire 76			 Dec.	1980
USA	New York City	Feminist Art Institute		 Win.	1980
USA	Amherst, MA	Herten Gallery			 Fall	1980
FRANCE	Elbeuf		Gallery La Vie Des Choses	 Dec.	1981
USA	New York City	First Women's Bank		 Spr.	1981
ITALY	Milan		Gallery Quotidiano Donna	 Spr.	1981
ENGLAND London		Gallery-Shop Sisterwrite	 Sum.	1981
NETHERLANDS Amsterdam	Gallery-Cafe Francoise		 Fall	1981
W. GERMANY Stuttgart	Gallery Sarahcafe         	 Fall	1981
DENMARK Copenhagen	Touring Show of Scandinavia	 Fall	1981
NORWAY	Oslo		Touring Show of Scandinavia	 Fall	1981
SWEDEN	Stockholm	Touring Show of Scandinavia	 Fall	1981
FINLAND Helsinki	Touring Show of Scandinavia	 Fall	1981
FRANCE	Strasbourg	Cafe La Lune Noire		 Spr.	1982
SWITZERLAND Basel	Frauenzimmer Gallery		 Spr.	1982
CANADA	Ottawa		Den Art Gallery			 Spr.	1982
FRANCE	Paris		Center Audiovisuel Simone de Beauvoir Sum. 1982
USA	Los Angeles	Shimko's Signatures Gallery	 Fall	1982
INDIA	Bangalore	Ecole des Arts			 Jan.	1983
INDIA	Bombay		Touring Show			 Jan.	1983
INDIA	Delhi		Touring Show			 Jan.	1983
JAPAN	Tokyo		Ginza Gallery		         Feb.	1983
AFRICA	Ivory Coast	Abidjan Centre Culturel Francais Fall	1983
W.GERMANY W. Berlin    Frauen Cafe Winterfelt Gallery Kassandra Jan. 1984
AUSTRIA Vienna		Kristina Hartman Gallery	 Spr.	1984
USA	Allston, MA	L'Odeon Cafe			 Jan.	1985
CANADA	Toronto		The Fallout Shelter Gallery	 Sum.	1985
USA	Cambridge, MA	Rising Phoenix Gallery		 Sum.	1985
USA	Washington, DC	Peace Show Artists for Survival	 Fall	1985
USA	Ann Arbor, MI	Art Fair Private Gallery	 Sum.	1986
USA	Hartford, CT	M.S. Gallery			 Fall	1986
USA	Hartford, CT	Women's Research Institute       Dec.	1986
USA	Farmington, CT	Art Guild Spirale Gallery	 Jan.	1987
USA	Ellington, CT	Artery Gallery			 Spr.	1987
USA	Middletown, CT	Wesleyan Women's Studies Dept.	 Spr.	1987
USA	New Britain, CT	Ministry of Central CT State Univ. Sum.	1988
USA	Norwalk, CT	SONO Art Fair, Rec'd Top Prize*2 Sum.	1988
USA	New York City	SOHO-20 Gallery			 Fall	1988
USA	New York City	Petrouchka Show			 Spr.	1989
USA	New York City	La Signoria			 Sum.	1989
USA	New York City	City University of New York	 Spr.	1990
USA	Fairfield, CT	S.H.U.				 Spr.	1991
USA	Westport, CT	O...Gallery			 Fall	1991
USA	Pocatello, ID	Idaho State University		 Spr.	1992
USA	Hartford, CT	Agnetas				 Sum.	1992
USA	Southampton, NY	Long Island Savings Bank	 Sum.	1992
USA	W. Cornwall, CT	Harris Gallery			 Fall	1992
USA	Southbury, CT	Beaux 	Arts Gallery		 Spr.	1993
USA	Hartford, CT	Changing Taste		 	 Spr.	1993
USA	Unionville, CT	The River Gallery	         Fall	1993
USA	New York City	Earth Day Show			 Spr.	1994
USA	Hartford, CT	Pump House Gallery		 Sum.	1995
USA	New York City	Eco-fest			 Spr.	1996
AUSTRALIA Sydney	ABC Studios			 Spr.	1997
AUSTRALIA Mullumbimby	Women's Festival, Civic Centre	 Spr.	1997
RUSSIA	St. Petersburg	Pribaltiyskaya Hotel		 Win. 	1997
FINLAND Helsinki	Caisa International Cultural Centre Sum.1998
FRANCE	Paris		Galerie des Muses - Hotel Scribe Jan.	1999
FRANCE	Paris		Galerie Art Tisane		 Feb.	1999
GHANA	Accra		Novotel Accra City Centre	1999 -	2000
FRANCE	Paris		Bibliothèque Marguerite Durand	Dec.	2001
USA	Sleepy Hollow, NY Paradise Coast Restaurant	Dec.	2002
USA	New York City	Freedom Hall			Dec.	2002
USA	New York City	Freedom Hall			March	2003
RUSSIA	St. Petersburg	Hotel Angleterre		April	2003
RUSSIA	St. Petersburg	Corinthia Nevskij Palace Hotel	Dec.	2003
USA	New York City	Julia Burgos Cultural Center	Jan.	2004
DOMINICAN REPUBLIC Puerto Plata Casa de Cultura	Dec. 	2004
DOMINICAN REPUBLIC Puerto Plata Casa de Cultura	Jan.	2005
RUSSIA	St. Petersburg	House of Journalists		March	2005
RUSSIA	St. Petersburg	Corinthia Nevskij Palace Hotel	July 	2005
RUSSIA	St. Petersburg	Corinthia Nevskij Palace Hotel	Dec.	2005
RUSSIA	St. Petersburg	House of Journalists		March	2006
RUSSIA	St. Petersburg	Corinthia Nevskij Palace Hotel	May 	2006
USA	New York City	NYC Bloomingdale Library	August	2006
RUSSIA	St. Petersburg	Novotel St. Petersburg City Centre Sept.2006	
USA	New York City	NYC Broadway Library		Dec. 06-Jan. 07
RUSSIA	St. Petersburg	Corinthia Nevskij Palace Hotel	March 	2007
RUSSIA	St. Petersburg	Novotel St. Petersburg Centre	July 	2007
RUSSIA	St. Petersburg	Nashotel			March	2008
RUSSIA	St. Petersburg	Corinthia Nevskij Palace Hotel	Dec.	2008
USA	New York City	Contemporary Art Network Gallery March	2009
1—A Watercolor "Artstudio" 28x25 won its
participation in the International Biennale 
Rome Italy '75 and was sold there by Vadim 
Nechaev. 
2-	Won top prize at the Sono Art Fair.

References

Sources
Aiken, Susan Hardy and Barker, Adele (1993). Dialogues/Dialogi. Duke University Press. 
Rule, Wilma and Noonan, Norma (1996). Russian Women in Politics and Society. Greenwood Press.

External links
Woman and Earth official website

Feminist writers
Living people
Russian women poets
Russian women artists
Russian feminists
Russian women journalists
Harvard Fellows
Writers from Saint Petersburg
1943 births